Trinity Anglican Church is a parish of the Anglican Church of Canada located in Cambridge, Ontario, Canada. The church was built and consecrated in 1844, four years following the incorporation of the parish, by the Rt. Rev. John Strachan.  The Hon. Wm. Dickson donated the land on the right bank of the Grand River and together with his superintendent/manager, Absalom Shade, bore a large portion of the cost of clearing the land and building the church.  Both men were founders of Galt, Ontario.  Through a bequest by Absalom Shade, Trinity House, the Italianate style rectory, was built in 1873.  The park in front of Trinity Church was also a gift of the Dickson family and is open to the public. Trinity Anglican Church is the oldest stone church in Waterloo Region.

Arms

References

External links
 

Anglican church buildings in Ontario
19th-century Anglican church buildings in Canada
Churches in Cambridge, Ontario